The eighth Senate district of Connecticut elects one member of the Connecticut Senate. Its current senator is Republican Lisa Seminara, who was first elected in 2022. The district contains the towns of Norfolk, Hartland, Canton, Simsbury, New Hartford, Avon, Barkhamsted, Colebrook and parts of Granby, Harwinton and Torrington.

List of representatives

Recent elections

External links
 Google Maps - Connecticut Senate Districts

References

08
Norfolk, Connecticut
Hartland, Connecticut
Canton, Connecticut
Simsbury, Connecticut
New Hartford, Connecticut
Avon, Connecticut
Barkhamsted, Connecticut
Colebrook, Connecticut
Granby, Connecticut
Harwinton, Connecticut
Torrington, Connecticut